Tim Tetreault (born March 14, 1970) is an American nordic combined skier who competed from 1992 to 1998. He finished eighth in the 3 x 10 km team event at the 1992 Winter Olympics in Albertville.

Tetreault's best World cup finish was third in a 15 km individual event in Finland in 1997. His only career victory was in a World Cup B 15 km individual event in Germany in 1995.

External links
Nordic combined team Olympic results: 1988-2002 

American male Nordic combined skiers
Olympic Nordic combined skiers of the United States
Nordic combined skiers at the 1992 Winter Olympics
Nordic combined skiers at the 1994 Winter Olympics
Nordic combined skiers at the 1998 Winter Olympics
Living people
1970 births
People from Norwich, Vermont
Sportspeople from Vermont
Vermont Catamounts skiers